Akira Kazami (風見 章, Kazami Akira; 1886–1961) was a Japanese politician. He served as Secretary-General of the First Konoe Cabinet (1937-1939) and Minister of Justice of the Second Konoe Cabinet (1940).

Life 
Akira Kazami was born in Mitsukaido, Ibaraki Prefecture (present-day Jōsō, Ibaraki Prefecture). In 1905, he entered Waseda University where he joined the honorary school of Sugiura Jūgō. In 1913, Kazami joined Osaka Asahi Shimbun (currently part of The Asahi Shimbun) and spent his life working as a journalist for Kokusai Tsushin and The Shinano Mainichi Shimbun.

In 1928, he ran as a candidate for the first universal suffrage election, but failed. However, in 1930 he was elected for the first time and entered the Constitutional Democratic Party. He joined the Kokumin Dōmei in 1932 but left the party in 1936 to become independent. From no great prominence, he was made Secretary-General of the First Konoe Cabinet in 1937. He had been part of Konoe's think tank, the Showa Kenkyu Kai, for a number of years. He held the position until January 1939. In the 1940 Second Konoe Cabinet, he was Minister of Justice during the second half of the year but resigned after five months in office.

After his resignation, he quit his political career to become a farmer. Following the end of the Second World War, he was purged until 1951. In 1952, he returned to politics and was elected to the House of Representatives as an independent. In 1955, he joined the Japan Socialist Party. In 1960, he took part in the Anpo protests.

References 

1886 births
1961 deaths
Ministers of Justice of Japan
Kokumin Dōmei politicians